The Blue Ribbon Award for Best Cinematography is a prize recognizing the work of a cinematography of a Japanese film. It was awarded annually by the Association of Tokyo Film Journalists as one of the Blue Ribbon Awards. It was lastly awarded in 1965 at 16th Blue Ribbon Awards and discontinued.

List of winners

References

External links
Blue Ribbon Awards on IMDb

Awards established in 1950
Recurring events established in 1950
1950 establishments in Japan
Cinematography
Awards for best cinematography